The Best News/Current Affairs Presenter was an award presented annually at the Star Awards, a ceremony that was established in 1994.

The category was introduced in 2000, at the 7th Star Awards ceremony; Chun Guek Lay received the award for her performance and it was given in honour of a MediaCorp presenter who has delivered an outstanding performance in a news/current affairs programme. The nominees were determined by a team of judges employed by MediaCorp; winners were selected by a majority vote from the entire judging panel.

Since its inception, the award was given to four presenters. Tung Soo Hua is the most recent and final winner in this category. Tung is also the only presenter to win in this category five times, surpassing Chun who has two wins. Ng Siew Leng was nominated on nine occasions, more than any other presenter. Lin Chi Yuan holds the record for the most nominations without a win, with six.

The award was discontinued from 2010 and separated into two newly formed categories, namely the Best News Presenter and Best Current Affairs Presenter awards, to create distinctions between the news and current affairs presenters.

Recipients

 Each year is linked to the article about the Star Awards held that year.

Category facts

Most wins

Most nominations

References

External links 

Star Awards